Alberto Bertapelle, better known by his stage name Brainbug, was an Italian symphonic electronic trance music producer and guitarist from Ceggia, Italy. He died during a concert in November 2016 at 57 years old.

Early life 
Alberto Bertapelle is from Ceggia, a town in the province of Venice. Since the age of 13, he played in many local bands as a guitarist and as a keyboardist. He taught sound engineering at a musical academy he started, Support Music Academy.

Career 
During 1993-1994, Bertapelle worked for Media Records before opening his own recording studio where he started producing his own music. He also worked for Great Dane Records, for whom he has released many records. He later worked for Danceworks and signed to EMI in London.

He achieved mainstream success with the single "Nightmare" which was a top ten hit in many countries including the United Kingdom and the United States. The single also won the International Award WMC in Miami and was certified gold in Australia.

"Nightmare" appeared in the soundtrack of several films, such as Human Traffic, Playing by Heart and A Night at the Roxbury. It was played as the players of Manchester City appeared before the start of a match when they played at Maine Road, and is still used on the odd occasion at the Etihad Stadium to this day. It was also used during the second half kick-off at Leeds United home games at Elland Road as well as being the entrance music for the 2013 Elite League Nottingham Panthers Ice Hockey team. The music video was directed by Tim Claxton and was inspired by 1950s science fiction films, and the films of Ed Wood.

Further singles, "The 8th Dwarf" (1997) and "Rain" (1998) took the formula established by "Nightmare" and "Benedictus" and explored some different areas. "Rain" features lyrics by Italian singer Nadia Casari, who also appears in the music video.

Several remixes by various artists have been released on Brainbug's singles, and not all of Bertapelle's originals are obviously titled. "Nightmare (Sinister Strings Mix)" and "Benedictus (Exitiale Mix)" are examples of this. The Maxi-CD release of "Rain" also features those original mixes, although "Benedictus (Exitiale Mix)", while not labeled as an edit, was edited slightly shorter.

Bertapelle has also added his symphonic trance touch to other artists' works through various remixes.

Death 
On 23 November 2016, Bertapelle died of a suspected heart attack at 57 years old while playing the guitar in a performance on stage during a concert in Tavagnacco of Udine, Italy. Despite having a group of nurses in the audience who performed CPR and an ambulance arriving shortly after, Bertapelle was pronounced dead as nothing was able to be done to save his life.

Discography

Compilation albums

Singles

Remixes
"The Age Of Love" - Age Of Love (1990; remix 1998)
"Ever Rest" - Mystica (1998)
"SuperSonic" - Music Instructor featuring. The Flying Steps (1999)
"Rock Your Body" - Music Instructor (1999)
"Another Day" - Skip Raiders Feat. Jada (2000)

References

External links
Official MySpace page with sound clips

Italian electronic musicians
Italian trance musicians
Musicians from the Metropolitan City of Venice
1958 births
2016 deaths
Musicians who died on stage